Łukasz Hanzel (born 16 September 1986) is a Polish footballer who plays for LKS Goczałkowice-Zdrój as a midfielder.

Club career
He is a trainee of LKS Pogórze. In July 2007, he joined Zagłębie Lubin.

References

Notes 
 

1986 births
People from Cieszyn
Sportspeople from Silesian Voivodeship
Polish footballers
Living people
Association football midfielders
Zagłębie Lubin players
Piast Gliwice players
Wigry Suwałki players
Ruch Chorzów players
Podbeskidzie Bielsko-Biała players
Skra Częstochowa players
LKS Goczałkowice-Zdrój players
Ekstraklasa players
I liga players
III liga players